This is a list of transactions that have taken place during the off-season and the 2017–18 PBA season.

Executive Board

List of transactions

Retirement

Coaching changes

Offseason

Player movements

Trades

Pre-season

All-Filipino

Commissioner's Cup

Governors' Cup

Free agency

Additions
 Nico Elorde - Globalport Batang Pier
 Jason Ballesteros - Meralco Bolts
 Mac Baracael - Meralco Bolts
 Niño Canaleta - Meralco Bolts
 Dylan Ababou - Kia Picanto
 Kyle Pascual - Magnolia Hotshots
 Chico Lanete - San Miguel Beermen
 Billy Mamaril - San Miguel Beermen
 Carlo Lastimosa - Kia Picanto
 Prince Caperal - Barangay Ginebra San Miguel
 Jeric Teng - GlobalPort Batang Pier

Released

Waived
 Rico Maierhofer - GlobalPort Batang Pier (signed with Tanduay Alab Pilipinas)
 Jason Deutchman - Kia Picanto
 Josan Nimes - Kia Picanto
 Michael Mabulac - San Miguel Beermen (signed with Laguna Heroes (MPBL)

Rookie Signings
 Christian Standhardinger (San Miguel) - 3 years / 8.55 million
 Kiefer Ravena (NLEX) - 3 years / 8.55 million
 Jeron Teng (Alaska) - 3 years / 8.55 million
 Jason Perkins (Phoenix) - 3 years / 8.55 million

2017 PBA draft

References

transactions
Transactions, 2017-18